Events in the year 1987 in Switzerland.

Incumbents
Federal Council:
Pierre Aubert (President)
Leon Schlumpf
Otto Stich
Jean-Pascal Delamuraz 
Elisabeth Kopp 
Arnold Koller 
Flavio Cotti

Births

 21 June - Sabrina Jaquet.
 7 April - Marco Mangold.
 22 September - Michèle Jäggi.

Deaths

 16 March - Raymond Passello.
 15 October - August Erne.
 16 October - Patrizia Kummer.

References

 
Years of the 20th century in Switzerland
1980s in Switzerland